"Aon Rud Persanta" (Irish for Nothing Personal) is the eleventh episode of the sixth season of Sons of Anarchy. It first aired on November 19, 2013 in the United States.

This episode marks the final appearance for Clay Morrow (Ron Perlman).

Plot
Clay gets broken out during his prison transfer, and Bobby gets shot in the process. Jax exacts his revenge on the Irish and Clay for past wrongdoings. Patterson is unhappy with the way Jax upheld his end of the deal and makes it seem as if she's going to throw that deal out. Tara contemplates making a deal of her own to stay out of jail and get her and her sons out of Charming for good.

Reception
In a review by Diana Steenbergen for IGN, the episode received a 9.5|10 rating; stating "A powerful episode of Sons of Anarchy delivered more than one shocking moment with the focus on Jax bringing SAMCRO’s dealings with both Clay Morrow and the Irish gunrunning business to an end." Zach Handlin of The AV Club gave the episode a B+ rating, while Allison Keene  of Collider gave it an A- rating.

References

Sons of Anarchy episodes
2013 American television episodes